Clochemerle, published in the United States as The Scandals of Clochemerle, is a French satirical novel by Gabriel Chevallier (1895–1969) first published in 1934. It centres on personal rivalries and local politics in the fictional village of Clochemerle, inspired by Vaux-en-Beaujolais, in Beaujolais in 1923 and satirises the conflict between Catholics and republicans in the Third Republic. The story concerns a dispute over the construction of a vespasienne (public urinals) near the village church. In its satirical portraits of individual inhabitants, it is an example of observational humour.

The book received considerable public acclaim and was awarded the Prix Courteline in 1934. The cartoonist Albert Dubout was subsequently commissioned to create an illustrated version. Chevallier subsequently wrote two sequels to the work after the Second World War entitled Clochemerle Babylone (1951) and Clochemerle-les-Bains (1963). The term Clochemerle and adjective clochemerlesque have entered French as a term to describe "petty, parochial squabbling".

Clochemerle has been widely translated into other languages and has inspired numerous dramatisations. Raymond Souplex composed an operetta based on the work in 1944 and a film was produced in 1948. There have been several television series based on the work, notably a 1972 BBC dramatisation.

See also
The Little World of Don Camillo and Peppone (1948)

References

Further reading

External links
"Books: Clochemerle 1923". Time. 26 April 1937.

1934 French novels
French satirical novels
Novels set in France
French novels adapted into television shows
French Third Republic